Peter Newhard (July 26, 1783 – February 19, 1860) was an American politician from Pennsylvania who served as a Democratic member of the U.S. House of Representatives for Pennsylvania's 8th congressional district from 1839 to 1843.

Biography
Newhard was born in Allentown, Pennsylvania.  He is credited with opening the hardware store in Allentown in 1812.  He served as street commissioner of the borough of Allentown in 1812, and coroner of Lehigh County, Pennsylvania, in 1816 and 1817.  He was elected to the Pennsylvania House of Representatives in 1817, 1818, 1819, 1824, 1825, and 1829, the term then being one year.

He was a member of the Pennsylvania State Senate for the 12th district from 1833 to 1836. He served as chairman of the town council in 1824 and again in 1837.

Newhard was elected as a Democrat to the Twenty-sixth and Twenty-seventh Congresses.  He was not a candidate for renomination in 1842.  He served as burgess in 1843 and trustee of Allentown Academy in 1822, 1826, and 1843.  He died in Allentown in 1860 and is interred at the Linden Street Cemetery in Allentown.

Notes

Sources

Peter Newhard at The Political Graveyard

|-

|-

1783 births
1860 deaths
Democratic Party members of the Pennsylvania House of Representatives
American coroners
Politicians from Allentown, Pennsylvania
Democratic Party members of the United States House of Representatives from Pennsylvania
Democratic Party Pennsylvania state senators
19th-century American politicians